The 2007–08 Philadelphia 76ers season was the 69th season of the franchise, 59th in the National Basketball Association (NBA). The Sixers finished the regular season at 40-42. In the first round of the playoffs, they lost to the Detroit Pistons in six games.

Key dates
 June 28: The 2007 NBA Draft took place in New York City, New York.
 July 1: The free agency period started.
 October 12: The Sixers pre-season started with a game against the Brooklyn Nets.
 November 2: The Sixers season started with a game against the Chicago Bulls.
 December 4: General Manager Billy King was fired and replaced by former Brooklyn Nets GM Ed Stefanski.
 April 4: The Sixers clinched a playoff berth to the 2008 NBA Playoffs.
 May 1: The Sixers were eliminated from the 2008 NBA Playoffs with their game 6 loss to Detroit finishing the series 4-2.

Summary

NBA Draft 2007
On May 22, the Sixers were assigned the 12th overall selection in the NBA Draft Lottery. On June 28, The Sixers then used that pick to select  forward Thaddeus Young from Georgia Tech. The Sixers also held picks 21 and 30 of the first round that they received last season in a trade with the Denver Nuggets for Allen Iverson. They used these picks to select guard Daequan Cook from Ohio State and Petteri Koponen from Finland. In the second round the Sixers selected center Kyrylo Fesenko with the 30th overall pick. During the draft, Daequan Cook was traded to the Miami Heat for also recently drafted forward Jason Smith. Petteri Koponen was traded to the Portland Trail Blazers for swingman Derrick Byars. Finally, Kyrylo Fesenko was traded to the Utah Jazz for forward/center Herbert Hill.

Draft picks
Philadelphia's selections from the 2007 NBA Draft in New York, New York.

Roster

Regular season

Standings

Record vs. opponents

Playoffs

|- style="background:#bfb;"
| 1 || April 20 || @ Detroit || 90–86 || Miller (20) || Evans (14) || Iguodala (8) ||The Palace of Auburn Hills22,076 || 1–0
|- style="background:#edbebf;"
| 2 || April 23 || @ Detroit || 88–105 || Williams (17) || Evans (11) || Iguodala (4) ||The Palace of Auburn Hills22,076 || 1–1
|- style="background:#bfb;"
| 3 || April 25 || Detroit || 95–75 || Dalembert (23) || Dalembert (16) || Green, Iguodala (6) ||Wachovia Center18,805 || 2–1
|- style="background:#edbebf;"
| 4 || April 27 || Detroit || 84–93 || Young (15) || Dalembert (12) || Iguodala (5) ||Wachovia Center18,347 || 2–2
|- style="background:#edbebf;"
| 5 || April 29 || @ Detroit || 81–98 || Iguodala (21) || Evans (7) || Iguodala (6) ||The Palace of Auburn Hills22,076 || 2–3
|- style="background:#edbebf;"
| 6 || May 1 || Detroit || 77–100 || Iguodala (16) || Evans (7) || Evans, Ollie (3) ||Wachovia Center14,130 || 2–4
|-

Player statistics

Regular season

Playoffs

Awards and records

Awards
 Andre Miller was named the Eastern Conference Player of the Week for games played from February 4 through February 10.
 Thaddeus Young, NBA All-Rookie Team 2nd Team

Records
 The Sixers broke the team record of fewest points allowed in a game by only giving up 63 points to the Charlotte Bobcats on November 7, 2007.
 Willie Green had a career-high 37 points against the Toronto Raptors on April 4, 2007.

Milestones

Transactions
The 76ers have been involved in the following transactions during the 2007-08 season.

Trades

Free Agents

Additions

Subtractions

See also
 2007-08 NBA season

References

Philadelphia 76ers seasons
2007–08 NBA season by team
Philadelphia
Philadelphia